Daniel Hawksford (born 10 April 1980) is a Welsh stage and screen actor.

Stage career
Before starting his professional career, Hawksford trained at the Royal Academy of Dramatic Art (RADA). He is an associate artist for Clwyd Theatr Cymru.

Hawksford's work in theatre includes: Much Ado About Nothing and The Hour We Knew Nothing Of Each Other at the National Theatre; The School of Night, The Tamer Tamed, The Taming of the Shrew and Cymbeline for the RSC; Jackets at the Young Vic, London; Troilus and Cressida, Romeo and Juliet and Rosencrantz and Guildenstern Are Dead at Clwyd Theatr Cymru, Wales; The Pull of Negative Gravity at the Traverse Theatre, Edinburgh and 59E59, New York; Memory at ESG, New York; Aqua NeroReview of Acqua Nero from the theatre dance and drama in Wales web site for Sgript Cymru; Romeo and Juliet at the Northcott Theatre, Exeter and Lunch at The King's Head Theatre, London. He also played Malcolm in Shakespeare's Globe's production of Macbeth.

Personal life 
In May 2018, he married English stage and screen actress Niky Wardley, with whom he had previously worked in the Royal National Theatre production of Shakespeare's Much Ado About Nothing (2007–2008), starring Zoë Wanamaker and Simon Russell Beale as Beatrice and Benedick. In 2022, they both appeared in the Netflix mockumentary sitcom Hard Cell (2022).

Filmography

Film

Television

Video games 

 The Witcher 2: Assassins of Kings (2011)
 The Adventures of Tintin: The Secret of the Unicorn (2011)
 Assassin's Creed IV: Black Flag (2013)

References

External links 

1980 births
Alumni of RADA
Welsh male stage actors
Welsh male television actors
People from Newport, Wales
Welsh male Shakespearean actors
Living people